Horace Grant Underwood (19 July 1859 – 12 October 1916) was a Presbyterian missionary, educator, and translator who dedicated his life to developing Christianity in Korea.

Early life
Underwood was born in London and immigrated to the United States at age 12. He graduated from New York University in 1881 and New Brunswick Theological Seminary in 1884.

Work in Korea

Underwood served as a Northern Presbyterian Church missionary in Korea, teaching physics and chemistry at Gwanghyewon (광혜원) in Seoul, the first modern hospital of Korea. Underwood arrived in Korea on the same boat as Henry G. Appenzeller on Easter Sunday (5 April) 1885, and he also worked with Henry Appenzeller, William B. Scranton, James Scarth Gale, and William D. Reynolds to translate the Bible into Korean.   The New Testament was completed in 1900 and the Old Testament in 1910. Underwood also worked with Horace N. Allen, an American missionary doctor attached to the royal court. In 1900, Underwood and James Scarth Gale established the Seoul YMCA, and in 1912 Underwood became the president of the Pyeongtaek University established by Arthur Tappan Pierson (평택대학교, 구 피어선기념성경학교).  The same year Underwood became the president of the Joseon Christian College (경신학교 儆新學校), the predecessor of Yonsei University. Underwood wrote several books on Korea, including
The Call of Korea.

Personal life

Underwood's older brother, John T. Underwood, a typewriter entrepreneur based in New York, helped finance Horace Grant's missionary endeavours.  In 1889, Underwood married Lillias Horton (1851–1921), a doctor. In 1916, Underwood returned to the US due to failing health, but he died shortly thereafter in Atlantic City. He was originally buried at Grove Church Cemetery in North Bergen, New Jersey, his body was transferred from New Jersey to Yanghwajin Foreigners' Cemetery, Seoul, South Korea in 1999.

Underwood family legacy

Underwood's legacy is visible at various Christian educational institutes in Seoul. There is a statue of Underwood in the centre of the Yonsei University campus, and the Underwood Activity Center of Seoul Foreign School is dedicated to his grandson, Richard F. Underwood. Underwood's descendants continued to develop Korean society, religion, politics and education for over one hundred years. His son Horace Horton Underwood (1890–1951) continued the tradition of education and worked at Yonhi University, another predecessor of Yonsei University. Horace Horton and his wife Ethel named their son Horace Grant Underwood II (1917–2004) who, among other notable achievements, served as an interpreter in the Korean War armistice talks. The Underwood family is no longer involved with mission work but continues to serve in Korea at the US Embassy and in business.

The New Brunswick Theological Seminary has an endowed chair in honour of Underwood for a professor specialising in Global Christianity and missions.

See also
 Christianity in South Korea

References

External links

 The first Presbyterian missionaries in Korea
 
 

1859 births
1916 deaths
American Presbyterian missionaries
Presbyterian missionaries in Korea
Translators of the Bible into Korean
University and college founders
19th-century translators
New York University alumni
English emigrants to the United States
American expatriates in Korea
Missionary educators
Missionary linguists
Yonsei University
Burials in South Korea